Carlos Caballero may refer to:

Carlos José Caballero (1917–1963), Argentinian politician
Carlos Caballero (Spanish footballer) (born 1984), Spanish football midfielder
Carlos Caballero (Honduran footballer) (born 1958), Honduran footballer and manager
Carlos Caballero (weightlifter) (born 1927), Colombian weightlifter
Carlos Miguel Caballero, Cuban actor

See also
Caballero (surname)